Boyer is an unincorporated community in Pocahontas County, West Virginia, United States.

The community was named for a businessperson in the lumber industry.

Notable person
Opal Wilcox Barron was born here on September 19, 1914.  She became the First Lady of West Virginia from 1961 to 1965.

References

Unincorporated communities in Pocahontas County, West Virginia
Unincorporated communities in West Virginia